IZ Aquarii is a red giant star in the constellation Aquarius. It is a slow irregular variable that varies between magnitudes 6.23 and 6.47.

References

M-type giants
Slow irregular variables
Aquarius (constellation)
J21344276+0149447
Durchmusterung objects
205358
106544
Aquarii, IZ